The 1989 Cork Junior A Hurling Championship was the 92nd staging of the Cork Junior A Hurling Championship since its establishment by the Cork County Board. The championship began on 24 September 1989 and ended on 14 November 1989.

On 14 November 1989, Clyda Rovers won the championship following an 0–11 to 1–07 defeat of Ballinascarthy in a final replay. It remains their only championship title.

References

1989 in hurling
Cork Junior Hurling Championship